Peter Genders (born 6 March 1959) is an Australian sprint canoeist who competed in the mid-1980s. He finished fifth in the K-1 1000 m event while being eliminated in the repechages of the K-2 500 m events at the 1984 Summer Olympics in Los Angeles.

References
Sports-Reference.com profile

1959 births
Australian male canoeists
Canoeists at the 1984 Summer Olympics
Living people
Olympic canoeists of Australia